James Chukwueze Obialor popularly known as WF James Brown, is a Nigerian internet personality, dancer and cross dresser who was noted in 2018 following a viral video in which he said the phrase "They did not caught me" following an arrest by the police. He was arrested alongside 46 others for being allegedly gay and spent a month at the Ikoyi Correctional Facility. The case against them was later dismissed by a court.

Brown released a single titled "Hey Dulings" in 2021 after a catchphrase he uses to address his fans on social media.

He claim to have been infected with HIV at birth.

References 

Living people
Nigerian entertainment industry businesspeople
Male-to-female cross-dressers
Nigerian transgender people
1999 births